Nagaram Nidrapotunna Vela  is a 2011 Telugu-language philosophical film, produced by Nandi Srihari on Gurudeva Creations Pvt. Ltd. banner and directed by Prem Raj. It stars Jagapati Babu, Charmee Kaur  and music composed by Yasho Krishna. The film received negative reviews.

Plot
The film begins in a forest where a college team moves on an excursion. On that spot shockingly they detect a pen drive with traces of blood around. Consequently, they open it which shows the lifestyle of a journalist Niharika works for Channel-4. So, the students feel something fishy and inquire after comeback. Firstly, they meet Niharika's friend Supraja in the channel who divulges the actuality.

Niharika is a sincere journalist who always fights for social welfare. Anyhow, the channel MD Prasada Rao always hinders and chides her programs. Hence, she ventures out alone in the night for controversial news. Ahead before, the channel plans an interview with Minister Janardhan Rao. Whereupon he involuntarily proclaims his secret talk to his colleagues in the visitors' room to become Chief Minister by collapsing the government. Fortunisiosly, it is recorded in Niharika's pen camera to which she is unbeknownst. Now Minister intrigues and assigns the task of eliminating Niharika to his men.

Meanwhile, Niharika proceeds as per her operation wandering the streets and heed on inequities, irregularities, and evils in society. En route, she is acquainted with a jokester alcoholic stranger Sivarama Prasad one that is deprived by society. He rescues her from various dangers late last night. On that momentary travel itself, the two be friends and likes each other.

Besides Minister sets out his subterfuge by accumulating MLAs'. Over there, his men attack Niharika for the camera when Sivarama Prasad saves and smells the matter rotten. Thus, the pair views the video and realizes the machinate of Minister Janardhan Rao. Immediately, Niharika hands over the proof to her MD but the sly auctions it before Minister. Being aware of it, Niharika questions, Sivarama Prasad retorts on him and quits the place. On their way back, the heels seek to slay them when Sivarama Prasad sacrifices his life while guarding Niharika. Before leaving his breath, he confesses his love and also takes an oath from her to awaken social conscience among the public.

Later, Niharika's colleague Shivaji provides her with a copy after soul-searching. Currently, she directly passes it to Chief Minister who also backstabs by conspiring with Minister. Moreover, the police lay hold of Niharika, haul to the forest, and encounter her. Simultaneously, the evil forces prevail and high religious riots leave severe destruction. Apart from this, the students find the whereabouts of Niharika who has been rescued by tribes. At last, Niharika unites the people and conducts a social revolt when the wicked politicians are ceased by the public. Finally, the movie ends with Niharika moving on her path to a new mission.

Cast
Jagapati Babu as Sivarama Prasad 
Charmee Kaur as Niharika
Pilla Prasad as Minister Janardhan Rao 
Chandra Mohan as MLA Kishtaiah 
Paruchuri Gopala Krishna as Niharika's father 
Siva Reddy as Journalist Shivaji 
Prudhvi Raj as Inspector 
Satya Prakash as Police 
Babu Mohan as MLA
Ahuti Prasad as Channel-4 MD Prasada Rao
Vizag Prasad as Party President 
Uttej as Minister's brother-in-law 
Goreti Venkanna as Venkanna 
Gundu Hanumantha Rao as Priest
Gundu Sudarshan as Lecturer 
Ananth as Priest
Sarika Ramachandra Rao
Laxman Meesala
Supraja as Journalist Supraja
Sandhya Janak as Niharika's mother

Soundtrack

Music was composed by Yasho Krishna and released by ADITYA Music Company.

References

External links
 

2011 films
2010s Telugu-language films